Blanka Pěničková is a former Czech football midfielder, currently assistant coach for Slavia Prague in the Czech First Division. She has also played in Italy's Serie A for UPC Tavagnacco.

She played for the Czech national team. She made her debut on 25 April 1999 in a match against  Austria.

Titles
 5 Czech League (2003, 2014, 2015, 2016, 2017)

References

1980 births
Living people
Czech women's footballers
Czech Republic women's international footballers
Sportspeople from Jablonec nad Nisou
Czech expatriate women's footballers
U.P.C. Tavagnacco players
Expatriate women's footballers in Italy
Serie A (women's football) players
Czech expatriate sportspeople in Italy
Women's association football midfielders
Women's association football forwards
SK Slavia Praha (women) players
Czech Women's First League players